Chandrikapersad "Chan" Santokhi (Sarnami: चान संतोखी; ; ; born 3 February 1959) is a Surinamese politician and former police officer who is the 9th president of Suriname, since 2020. After winning the 2020 elections, Santokhi was the sole nominee for president of Suriname. On 13 July, Santokhi was elected president by acclamation in an uncontested election. He was inaugurated on 16 July.

Early life

Chandrikapersad Santokhi was born on 3 February 1959, into an Indo-Surinamese Hindu family in Lelydorp, in district Suriname (now known as district Wanica). He grew up in the countryside as the youngest in a family of nine children. His father worked at the harbor of Paramaribo and his mother worked as a shop assistant in Lelydorp.

Career

Police career 

After Santokhi obtained his VWO diploma at the Algemene Middelbare School in Paramaribo, he received a scholarship to study in the Netherlands. From 1978 till 1982, he studied at the Police Academy of the Netherlands in Apeldoorn. After completing his study he returned to Suriname in September 1982, to work for the police. Since the age of 23, Santokhi worked as a police inspector in Geyersvlijt and Wanica until he was appointed in 1989 as head of the national criminal investigation department. In 1991, he was appointed commissioner of police.

Minister of Justice 

In September, 2005, Santokhi was sworn in as Minister of Justice and Police on behalf of the Progressive Reform Party. His period in office was marked by a heavy crackdown on crime, in particular drug trafficking, and a strict, no-nonsense enforcement of law and order. This earned him the nickname sheriff, which he got from Dési Bouterse.

December murders trial 

Santokhi who, as police commissioner, led the investigation of the December murders done at the start of his ministership so that the December murders trial could finally commence. Exclusive for the December murders trial he had a heavily secured courtroom built in Domburg, Wanica.
Because Santokhi was the impulse behind the trial, he became a much discussed matter of the main suspect in that trial, Dési Bouterse. Bouterse said on 26 November 2007, four days before the commencement of the trial, that Santokhi wanted to "imprison and kill him". Bouterse adduced that numerous previous attempts to "take him out" all failed and warned Santokhi to be cautious with his "intentions to eliminate Bouterse". On 29 November 2019, the Court of Appeal reached a verdict in the December murders trial, and Bouterse had been convicted to 20 years' imprisonment.

On 10 September 2008, Santokhi sued Bouterse for insult, slander and defamation, because Bouterse had alleged that Santokhi had ties to drug dealers and other criminals. On 23 September 2008, the court ruled that the allegations were unproven, ordered Bouterse to publish a rectification, and a penalty payment of SRD100,000 for each day Bouterse failed to execute the sentence. The same day, Bouterse placed a rectification in De West where he admitted that the statements were untrue.

2010 general election

In the 2010 Surinamese general election, Santokhi received the highest number of votes after Dési Bouterse, despite being placed relatively low on the party list of the Progressive Reform Party. In July of that year, he was appointed as presidential candidate on behalf of the ruling political alliance New Front for Democracy and Development. Santokhi's opponent in the presidential elections was Dési Bouterse. Since Bouterse (NDP) cooperated with Ronnie Brunswijk (ABOP) and Paul Somohardjo (PL), his political alliance had a total of 36 seats, while the New Front only had fourteen. Consequently, Bouterse was elected the eighth President of Suriname.

President of CICAD 

Santokhi, who for fifteen years was the official representative of the Inter-American Drug Abuse Control Commission (CICAD), was chosen on 6 December 2010, as president of this organization for one year. CICAD is an autonomous body of the Organization of American States, that coordinates the drug policy of the Western Hemisphere. In 2009, Santokhi was, also for one year, the vice-president of this organization.

Chairman of the Progressive Reform Party

On 3 July 2011, Santokhi was elected as chairman of the Vooruitstrevende Hervormings Partij (VHP) (Progressive Reform Party). The Progressive Reform Party, which was once an Indo-Surinamese party, has grown, since the appointment of Santokhi as chairman, into a multi-ethnical party which, according to current statistics, is the second-biggest political party in Suriname. With eight seats in the parliament, the VHP was the biggest opposition party until 2020.

President of Suriname

On 26 May 2020, the preliminary results of the 2020 Surinamese general election showed that the VHP was the largest party, and that Chan Santokhi was the most likely candidate to become the ninth President of Suriname. On 30 May, Chan Santokhi announced his candidacy for President of Suriname. On 29 June, the VHP nominated Chan Santokhi as their candidate for the Presidency. On 7 July, the coalition nominated Chan Santokhi as President of Suriname and Ronnie Brunswijk as Vice-President of Suriname. No other candidates had been nominated on 8 July 2020, 15:00 (UTC−3), and on 13 July, Santokhi was elected as president by acclamation in an uncontested election. He was inaugurated on 16 July, on the Onafhankelijkheidsplein in Paramaribo in ceremony without the public due to the COVID-19 pandemic. He took his oath reciting Hindu Sanskrit shloks and mantras in his oath ceremony. Santokhi's inauguration was also blessed by several Christian religious leaders.

In September 2021, Santokhi visited the Netherlands and became the first Surinamese president to do so since 2008, after diplomatic relations between the two countries had cooled down. Prime Minister of the Netherlands Mark Rutte referred to the rapprochement as "historic".

Personal life
On 19 July 2020, Chan Santokhi married his long-term partner, Mellisa Kavitadevi Seenacherry. The marriage took place in a private ceremony. Mellisa is a lawyer by profession. He also has two adult children (a daughter and a son) from a previous marriage.

References

External links 

 Chan Santokhi's Facebook page
 Chan Santokhi's Twitteraccount

|-

|-

1959 births
Living people
Justice ministers of Suriname
Interior ministers of Suriname
Members of the National Assembly (Suriname)
Surinamese people of Indian descent
Surinamese police officers
Surinamese politicians of Indian descent
People from Wanica District
Progressive Reform Party (Suriname) politicians
Presidents of Suriname
Surinamese Hindus
Recipients of Pravasi Bharatiya Samman